Foundation Course to Indian Civil Services is an introductory course designed for fresh recruits to the civil services in India. The Foundation Course (also called FC) introduces young civil servants to the avenues of governance and serves as launching pad for inter-service camaraderie.

Admission 
Candidates to the Foundation Course are invited for the course by the Department of Personnel and Training at Mussoorie after they have cleared the rigorous three-stage Civil Services Exam, conducted by the UPSC.

Education in India
Civil Services of India